Subhasish Mitra from Stanford University was named Fellow of the Institute of Electrical and Electronics Engineers (IEEE) in 2013 for contributions to design and test of robust integrated circuits.

References 

Fellow Members of the IEEE
Living people
Stanford University Department of Electrical Engineering faculty
Stanford University School of Engineering faculty
Year of birth missing (living people)
Place of birth missing (living people)
American electrical engineers